28S ribosomal protein L42, mitochondrial is a protein that in humans is encoded by the MRPL42 gene.

Mammalian mitochondrial ribosomal proteins are encoded by nuclear genes and help in protein synthesis within the mitochondrion. Mitochondrial ribosomes (mitoribosomes) consist of a small 28S subunit and a large 39S subunit. They have an estimated 75% protein to rRNA composition compared to prokaryotic ribosomes, where this ratio is reversed. Another difference between mammalian mitoribosomes and prokaryotic ribosomes is that the latter contain a 5S rRNA. Among different species, the proteins comprising the mitoribosome differ greatly in sequence, and sometimes in biochemical properties, which prevents easy recognition by sequence homology. This gene encodes a protein identified as belonging to both the 28S and the 39S subunits. Further experiments will be needed to identify the specific subunit localization. Sequence analysis identified three transcript variants that encode two different isoforms. Pseudogenes corresponding to this gene are found on chromosomes 4q, 6p, 6q, 7p, and 15q.

References

Further reading

Ribosomal proteins